The  1996 Big 12 Championship Game was a college football game played on Saturday, December 7, 1996, at Trans World Dome in  St. Louis. This was the 1st Big 12 Championship Game and determined the 1996 champion of the Big 12 Conference. The game featured the Nebraska Cornhuskers, champions of the North division, and the Texas Longhorns, champions of the South division.

Teams

Nebraska

Texas

Game summary

Statistics

See also
 Nebraska–Texas football rivalry

References

Championship
Big 12 Championship Game
Nebraska Cornhuskers football games
Texas Longhorns football games
American football in St. Louis
Big 12 Championship Game
Big 12 Championship Game